The  was a commuter electric multiple unit (EMU) train type operated by Nagoya Railroad (Meitetsu) in Japan since 1986.

Design
While broadly similar to the 5700 series trains introduced at the same time, the 5300 series trains were built using new bodies combined with electrical equipment from former 5000 and 5200 series EMUs. The last set was retired on 21 December 2019. No 5300 series cars have been preserved.

Formations
, the 5300 series fleet consists of four four-car sets (5304 to 5308) and one two-car set (5309).

References

Electric multiple units of Japan
5300 series
Train-related introductions in 1986

1500 V DC multiple units of Japan
Nippon Sharyo multiple units